James K. Okubo (May 30, 1920 – January 29, 1967) was a United States Army soldier. He was a posthumous recipient of the Medal of Honor for his actions in World War II.

Early life 
Okubo was born in Anacortes, Washington. His parents were Japanese immigrant parents. He was a Nisei, which means that he was a second generation Japanese-American.

Following the signing of Executive Order 9066, the Okubo family was interned at the Tule Lake War Relocation Center in California; and then they relocated to the camp at Heart Mountain in Wyoming.

Military service
Okubo joined the US Army in May 1943.

Okubo volunteered to be part of the all-Nisei 442nd Regimental Combat Team. This army unit was mostly made up of Japanese Americans from Hawaii and the mainland.

For his actions in October 1944, Okubo was awarded the Army's third-highest decoration, the Silver Star. After the war, he became a dentist in Detroit, and was killed in a car accident on January 29, 1967.

In the 1990s, there was a review of service records of Asian Americans who received the Silver Star during World War II. Okubo's award was one of those upgraded to the Medal of Honor and in a ceremony at the White House, on June 21, 2000, the formal presentation was made by President Bill Clinton. Twenty-one other Asian Americans also received the nation's highest military honor during the ceremony, but unfortunately, only seven were still alive to receive it.

Okubo's Medal of Honor recognized his conduct in frontline fighting in eastern France in 1944.

The words of Okubo's citation explain:
Technician Fifth Grade James K. Okubo distinguished himself by extraordinary heroism in action on 28 and 29 October and 4 November 1944, in the Foret Domaniale de Champ, near Biffontaine, eastern France. On 28 October, under strong enemy fire coming from behind mine fields and roadblocks, Technician Fifth Grade Okubo, a medic, crawled 150 yards to within 40 yards of the enemy lines. Two grenades were thrown at him while he left his last covered position to carry back wounded comrades. Under constant barrages of enemy small arms and machine gun fire, he treated 17 men on 28 October and 8 more men on 29 October. On 4 November, Technician Fifth Grade Okubo ran 75 yards under grazing machine gun fire and, while exposed to hostile fire directed at him, evacuated and treated a seriously wounded crewman from a burning tank, who otherwise would have died. Technician Fifth Grade James K. Okubo's extraordinary heroism and devotion to duty are in keeping with the highest traditions of military service and reflect great credit on him, his unit, and the United States Army.

Namesake
Okubo is the namesake of the Okubo Family Health Clinic at Joint Base Lewis-McChord in Washington.

The Okubo Barracks at the Fort Sam Houston in Texas are named after the Nisei soldier. The barracks are now used for wounded soldiers.

See also

List of Medal of Honor recipients
List of Medal of Honor recipients for World War II

References

External links
 "Army Secretary Lionizes 22 World War II Heroes" at Defense.gov

1920 births
1967 deaths
United States Army personnel of World War II
United States Army Medal of Honor recipients
United States Army non-commissioned officers
Combat medics
Japanese-American internees
American military personnel of Japanese descent
People from Bellingham, Washington
Recipients of the Silver Star
World War II recipients of the Medal of Honor
Burials at Woodlawn Cemetery (Detroit)